Type 91 may refer to:

Japanese war equipment
 Hiro Navy Type 91 Flying Boat, a 1930s Japanese bomber or reconnaissance monoplane flying boat
 Nakajima Army Type 91 Fighter, a Japanese fighter of the 1930s
 Type 91 Air-to-Ship Missile, a Japanese air-to-ship missile
 Hiro Type 91 (engine), a 12-cylinder, water-cooled W engine developed for aircraft use by the Imperial Japanese Navy in the mid-1930s
 Type 91 Hand Grenade, an improved version of the Type 10 fragmentation hand grenade/rifle grenade of the Imperial Japanese Army
 Type 91 10 cm howitzer, a 105 mm (4.13 in) howitzer used by the Imperial Japanese Army during the Second Sino-Japanese War and World War II
 Type 91 surface-to-air missile, a Japanese man-portable surface-to-air missile system
 Type 91 torpedo, an aerial torpedo of the Imperial Japanese Navy

Other
 T91 assault rifle, a Taiwanese assault rifle
 Type 91 Grenade Launcher, a Chinese grenade launcher used to launch 35mm non-lethal grenades
 Bristol Type 91 Brownie, a British light sports aircraft